The Aramazd mountains are located in Armenia. Mount Aramazd located in the south-east to Mount Aragats in the north-west.

References 

Mountains of Armenia